The Pirates! in an Adventure with Communists is the third book in The Pirates! series by Gideon Defoe to feature his hapless pirate crew. It was published in 2006 by Orion Books.

This book follows the adventures of the Pirate Captain and his crew through Paris and London—accompanied by Karl Marx and his sidekick Friedrich Engels—as they attempt to clear the communists' good name after it is sullied by Richard Wagner and his malevolent benefactor.

References

2006 British novels
Books about Karl Marx
British comedy novels
Novels set in Paris
Novels set in London
The Pirates!
Orion Books books